Juglans olanchana is a semideciduous tree species in the Juglandaceae family. It can be found in Costa Rica, Guatemala, El Salvador, Honduras, Mexico and Nicaragua. It can grow up to 40 m in height and 1.5 m in diameter. The long branches bear twigs tipped with 40–50 cm long, glabrous, pinately compound leaves, darker on the top than on the bottom. The base of the trunk sometimes has buttresses.

Habitat
Juglans olanchana grows in wet and very wet tropical forests, most frequently on river banks, observed from 0–1400 m above sea level. Reports that it also grows in the mountainous regions of Argentina may result from confusion with the cedro negro (Spanish for "Black Cedar" due to its close appearance to West Indian cedar) or nogal (Spanish for "walnut") (J. neotropica).

Economic importance

Timber
Juglans olanchana has a cylindrical, straight shaft that is free of branches for 5–15 m.  The moderately heavy (420–450 kg/m3) and moderately durable heartwood has a dark coffee color, is easy to work, and takes an excellent finish.  It is used for light construction, cabinetmaking, parquet floors, luxurious furniture, turnery, musical instruments, and veneer.

Fruit
The nuts are edible.  The husk is used to dye leather.

References 

olanchana
Endangered plants
Trees of Mexico
Trees of Nicaragua
Trees of Costa Rica
Trees of El Salvador
Trees of Guatemala
Taxonomy articles created by Polbot